Osiedle Nowy Glinnik  is a village in the administrative district of Gmina Lubochnia, within Tomaszów Mazowiecki County, Łódź Voivodeship, in central Poland.

The village has an approximate population of 998.

References

Osiedle Nowy Glinnik